Nailloux (Languedocien: Nalhós) is a commune in the Haute-Garonne department in southwestern France.

Population

Twin towns
Nailloux is twinned with:

  Canfranc, Spain
  Bucium, Romania

See also
Communes of the Haute-Garonne department

References

Communes of Haute-Garonne